was a professional wrestling event promoted by World Wonder Ring Stardom. It took place on January 29, 2022, with a limited attendance due in part to the ongoing COVID-19 pandemic at the time. It was the first pay-per-view of 2022 hosted by the promotion.

Storylines
The event's press conference where the matches were officially announced took place at the Tokyo Culture Culture venue and was broadcast on Stardom's YouTube channel. The show featured eight professional wrestling matches that resulted from scripted storylines, where wrestlers portrayed villains, heroes, or less distinguishable characters in the scripted events that built tension and culminated in a wrestling match or series of matches.

Event
The preshow five-way match was broadcast on Stardom's YouTube channel. Stardom announced on their twitter that Waka Tsukiyama, Mai Sakurai and Tam Nakano will miss the show due to bad health condition. After Hanan retained the Future of Stardom Championship over Lady C, her Stars stablemate Momo Kohgo stepped up as her next challenger. Hanan immediately accepted the challenge. Before the third match taking place, Prominence freelance stable wrestlers Risa Sera, Suzu Suzuki, Hiragi Kurumi, Akane Fujita and Mochi Miyagi appeared to the ring and called out Giulia whom they challenged at Stardom World Climax show in March and attacked her. The rest of the Donna Del Mondo stable made the save for Giulia in the process. Even so, the brawl continued backstage. Giulia and Mayu went to a thirty-minute draw. Stardom Executive Producer Rossy Ogawa said that they both receive World of Stardom title matches at Ryōgoku Kokugikan, Giulia on March 26 and Iwatani on March 27. In the main event Syuri successfully defended the World of Stardom Championship for the first time in her first reign against stablemate Mirai. After the match all the Donna Del Mondo members except an injured Natsupoi gathered in the ring to close the show.

Results

External links
Page Stardom World

References

2022 in professional wrestling
Women's professional wrestling shows
World Wonder Ring Stardom shows
World Wonder Ring Stardom
Events in Nagoya
Professional wrestling in Japan